Leon Chambers (born 17 April 1998) is an American-born Australian representative rower. He was twice an Australian U23 national champion and represented in the lightweight double-scull at the 2019 World Rowing Championships.

Club and state rowing
Chambers' senior club rowing in Australia is from the Sydney University Boat Club.

In 2018 in SUBC colours Chambers contested and won U23 men's lightweight single scull and the lightweight double scull title (with Matthew Curtin) at the Australian Rowing Championships.

International representative rowing
Chambers made his Australian representative debut at the 2018 World Rowing Cup III in Lucerne in a lightweight double scull .  In 2019 with Hamish Parry, Chambers raced in Australia's lightweight double scull at both World Rowing Cups in Europe  and was then selected to contest the 2019 World Rowing Championships in Linz, Austria. The double were looking for a top seven finish at the 2019 World Championships to qualify for the Tokyo Olympics. They placed second in the B-final for an overall eighth place finish and failed to qualify the boat for Tokyo 2020.

References

External links
 

1998 births
Living people
Australian male rowers